WTOE (1470 AM) is a radio station broadcasting an oldies format. It is licensed to and serves Spruce Pine, North Carolina, U.S. area. The station is currently owned by Mountain Valley Media.

History
WTOE signed on Christmas Eve 1955. The Sink family, owners of WKYK, have owned WTOE since September 1991.

WTOE is not to be confused with WTOE 5 News, a satirical fake news website.

References

External links

TOE